Waynea cretica is a species of corticolous (bark-dwelling), squamulose lichen in the family Ramalinaceae. It occurs on the Greek island of Crete and in Portugal.

Taxonomy

The lichen was formally described as a new species in 2006 by Esteve Llop. The species epithet refers to the type locality.

Description

Waynea cretica has an olivaceous to greyish-green, dull thallus with squamules measuring 0.125–0.75 mm wide. It does not have a prothallus. The photobiont partner is green algae, which are present in a layer (benaeth the hypothecium) that is 25–50 μm thick containing spherical green cells with diameters between 5 and 10 μm. The medulla, measuring 15 μm thick, is made of loosely interwoven hyphae. Apothecia are biatorine in form with a colour ranging from whitish pink to greyish or reddish violet and a diameter of 0.2–0.45 mm. Ascospores are colourless, long and needle-shaped (acicular), typically with 7 septa, and measure 29–41 by 1.6–2.2 μm. Like other species of Waynea, it contains the pigment called Sedifolia-grey in the upper part of the hymenium; this pigment is also present in the outer exciple (the rim of the apothecia) and the upper cortex.

Waynea algarvensis, described from Portugal in 2012, is similar in morphology. It can be distinguished from Waynea cretica by its minute thallus parts (up to 5 mm), and its shorter squamules. Waynea algarvensis has only been recorded on Quercus rotundifolia.

Habitat and distribution
These regions typically contain humid forest communities in ravines and canyons. The lichen has been recorded on the bark of Acer sempervirens, Old World sycamore (Platanus orientalis), and kermes oak (Quercus coccifera). Waynea cretica has since been recorded in several location in Algarve, Portugal.

References

Ramalinaceae
Lichen species
Lichens described in 2006
Lichens of Southwestern Europe
Lichens of Greece